The Gusen is a small river in Upper Austria.

The  flows through Reichenau im Mühlkreis and Gallneukirchen. The Gusen continues through Sankt Georgen an der Gusen. At Langenstein, near Mauthausen, the Gusen flows into the Danube.

References

Rivers of Upper Austria
Rivers of Austria